The 2002–03 FA Trophy is the thirty-fifth season of the FA Trophy.

Qualifying round

Ties

Replays

1st round

Ties

Replays

2nd round

Ties

Replays

3rd round
The teams from Football Conference entered in this round.

Ties

Replays

4th round

Ties

Replays

5th round

Ties

Replays

Quarter finals

Semi-finals

First leg

Second leg

Burscough win 2–1 on aggregate

Tamworth win 2–1 on aggregate after extra time

Final

The final was played at Villa Park, Birmingham, on Sunday 18 May 2003.

References

General
 Football Club History Database: FA Trophy 2002–03
 Rec.Sport.Soccer Statistics Foundation: FA Trophy 2002–03

Specific

2002–03 domestic association football cups
League
2002–03